Mood FM is a radio station broadcasting in Amman, Jordan.  Mood FM is part of Seagulls Broadcast Ltd. and broadcasts on the 92.0 and 91.5 MHz frequency.

External links
 Official website

Radio stations in Jordan
Mass media in Amman